The Gullegem Koerse is a single-day road cycling race held annually in Wevelgem, Belgium over a course consisting of eitht 20-kilometer laps. The race was first organized in 1942 and is one of the most important criterium races in Belgium, attracting a high level of competition.

Winners

References

External links

Cycle races in Belgium
Recurring sporting events established in 1942
1942 establishments in Belgium